Paso or PASO may refer to:

People
 Fernando del Paso (born 1935), Mexican novelist
 Juan José Paso, (1758–1833), Argentine politician

Other uses
 Paso (float), an elaborate float made for religious processions
 Paso (theatre), a seventeenth-century Spanish one-act comic scene
 Peruvian Paso, a breed of light saddle horse
 Paso Fino, a naturally-gaited light horse breed 
 Paso, a Spanish customary unit of length
 Paso, replaced by the longyi, traditional Burmese clothing
 "Paso (The Nini Anthem)", a 2012 song by Sak Noel
 Ducati Paso, a motorcycle
 Pacific Aviation Safety Office (PASO), an intergovernmental civil aviation authority
 Pan American Sports Organization (PASO), an international organization 
 Pannonia Allstars Ska Orchestra (PASO), a Hungarian band
 Primarias Abiertas Simultáneas y Obligatoria (PASO), a blanket primary system used in Argentina
 Seldovia Airport, Alaska, U.S., (ICAO airport code PASO)

See also 
 El Paso (disambiguation)
 Passo (disambiguation)
 Peso